Live on the Edge of Forever is the first live album by progressive metal band Symphony X, which was recorded in Élysée Montmartre, Paris during their European tour in 2000, and released in 2001.

The album starts like their previous studio effort V – The New Mythology Suite, but whereas "The Death of Balance" normally segues into "Lacrymosa," it now segues into "Candlelight Fantasia" from The Divine Wings of Tragedy album. Many classics are eventually played, including the neoclassical "Smoke and Mirrors" and the epic "The Divine Wings of Tragedy." No tracks from the first two albums are performed, even though the album's title references a track from The Damnation Game.

Track listing

Disc one
"Prelude" – 1:38
"Evolution (The Grand Design)" – 5:18
"Fallen / Transcendence (Segue)" – 6:31
"Communion and the Oracle" – 7:39
"The Bird-Serpent War" – 3:40
"On the Breath of Poseidon (Segue)" – 5:10
"Egypt" – 7:05
"The Death of Balance / Candlelight Fantasia" – 5:53
"The Eyes of Medusa" – 4:32

Disc two
"Smoke and Mirrors" – 6:35
"Church of the Machine" – 7:22
"Through the Looking Glass" – 14:09
"Of Sins and Shadows" – 7:23
"Sea of Lies" – 4:05
"The Divine Wings of Tragedy" – 19:55

Differences from studio versions
The openings of "Church of the Machine" and "The Divine Wings of Tragedy" are omitted.
"Through the Looking Glass" features an extended middle section.
Most notably on the tracks from V – The New Mythology Suite, parts that were originally played on keyboards are played on guitar and bass.
The ending of Rush's "YYZ" is played at the end of "The Divine Wings of Tragedy."

Personnel
Russell Allen - vocals
Michael Romeo - guitar
Michael Pinnella - keyboards
Michael LePond - bass
Jason Rullo - drums

References

Symphony X albums
2001 live albums
Inside Out Music live albums